Medellín is a village in the province of Badajoz, Extremadura, Spain, notable as both the birthplace of Hernán Cortés in 1485 and the site of the Battle of Medellín, during the Peninsular War. The second-largest city in Colombia, Medellín, was named in honour of the small village as well as Medellín, Veracruz in Mexico, two cities in Argentina, and Medellin, Cebu, in the Philippines.

The city was named after the Roman general Quintus Caecilius Metellus Pius, who founded it as a military base for his operations in western Iberia, during the Sertorian War. In Latin, it was called Metellinum. Medellín is well-known because of its cultural heritage, with places like the Roman theatre, the old castle and other archelogical sites. 
It has a population of 2,337 (2009) and an area of 65 km².

Gallery

See also
 Monument to Hernán Cortés (Medellín)
List of municipalities in Badajoz
Hernán Cortés
Conquistador

References

External links
Official website of Medellín 

Municipalities in the Province of Badajoz
Coloniae (Roman)
Populated places established in the 1st century BC